Koon Wai Chee Louisa (born 26 July 1980) is a badminton player from Hong Kong.

Koon competed in badminton at the 2004 Summer Olympics in women's doubles with partner Li Wing Mui.  They were defeated by Gail Emms and Donna Kellogg of Great Britain in the round of 32.

References

 Koon Louisa at Sports Reference

1980 births
Living people
Hong Kong female badminton players
Badminton players at the 2004 Summer Olympics
Badminton players at the 2000 Summer Olympics
Olympic badminton players of Hong Kong
Asian Games medalists in badminton
Badminton players at the 2002 Asian Games
Badminton players at the 2006 Asian Games
Badminton players at the 1998 Asian Games
Asian Games bronze medalists for Hong Kong
Medalists at the 2002 Asian Games
21st-century Hong Kong women